is a Japanese artistic gymnast. He won a gold medal at the 2013 World Artistic Gymnastics Championships in pommel horse. He made his Olympic debut at the age of 32 when he participated in the 2020 Summer Olympics in Tokyo as one of the two apparatus individuals allocated to the Japanese men's artistic gymnastics team on pommel horse.

References

External links
 Profile

1988 births
Living people
Sportspeople from Miyagi Prefecture
Medalists at the World Artistic Gymnastics Championships
Japanese male artistic gymnasts
Gymnasts at the 2020 Summer Olympics
Olympic gymnasts of Japan
20th-century Japanese people
21st-century Japanese people